Petherton Resource Centre is a centre for community mental health services in South Bristol, United Kingdom. It is managed by Avon and Wiltshire Mental Health Partnership NHS Trust.

History
The resource centre was established in an existing building in South Bristol shortly after the formation of the trust in 2001. Following the demolition of the existing building of traditional construction, a modern two-storey extension was constructed on the site.

Services
The centre is the base for the following teams:

 Crisis Service (Bristol South)
 Recovery Team (Bristol South)
 Bristol ADHD Service
 Bristol Autism Spectrum Service
 Specialist psychological service for anxiety and related problems
 Mental Health Criminal Justice Service

See also
 Brookland Hall - Central Bristol services
 Healthcare in Bristol

References

Hospitals in Bristol
Psychiatric hospitals in England
NHS hospitals in England